Sir Martin John Taylor, FRS (born 18 February 1952) is a British mathematician and academic. He was Professor of Pure Mathematics at the School of Mathematics, University of Manchester and, prior to its formation and merger, UMIST where he was appointed to a chair after moving from Trinity College, Cambridge in 1986. He was elected Warden of Merton College, Oxford on 5 November 2009, took office on 2 October 2010 and retired in September 2018.

Early life and education 
Taylor was born in Leicester in 1952 and educated at Wyggeston Grammar School. He gained a first class degree from Pembroke College, Oxford in 1973, and a Ph.D. from King's College London with a thesis entitled Galois module structure of  the ring of integers of l-extensions in 1976 under the supervision of  Albrecht Fröhlich.

Research 
His early research concerned various properties and structures of algebraic numbers. In 1981 he proved the Fröhlich conjecture relating the symmetries of algebraic integers to the behaviour of certain analytic functions called Artin L-functions. In recent years his research has led him to study various aspects of arithmetic geometry: in particular, he and his collaborators have demonstrated how geometric properties of zeros of integral polynomials in many variables can be determined by the behaviour of associated L-functions.

Awards 
Taylor was awarded the London Mathematical Society Whitehead Prize in 1982  and shared the Adams Prize in 1983. He was elected a Fellow of the Royal Society in 1996.  He was President of the London Mathematical Society from 1998 to 2000 and in 2004 was appointed Physical Secretary and Vice-President of the Royal Society. Taylor was knighted in the 2009 New Year Honours. Taylor received an honorary Doctorate of Science from the University of East Anglia in July 2012.

Personal life 
His hobbies include fly fishing and hill walking, and he is an enthusiastic supporter of Manchester United.

Notes

External links 

 Sir Martin Taylor's profile on the Merton College website
 

1952 births
Living people
Alumni of Pembroke College, Oxford
Alumni of King's College London
20th-century British mathematicians
21st-century British mathematicians
Number theorists
Fellows of the Royal Society
Fellows of Trinity College, Cambridge
Academics of the University of Manchester Institute of Science and Technology
Academics of the University of Manchester
Knights Bachelor
People educated at Wyggeston Grammar School for Boys
People from Bramhall
People from Leicester
Whitehead Prize winners
Wardens of Merton College, Oxford
Fellows of Merton College, Oxford